Brian Newberry is an American football coach and former player who is currently the head coach for the Navy Midshipmen football team. He had previously served as the team’s defensive coordinator.

Playing career 
Newberry played for the Baylor Bears. He was a co-Southwest Conference champion in 1994 and played in the Alamo Bowl.

Coaching career

Navy 
Newberry was named the defensive coordinator for Navy in 2019. He was a semifinalist for the Broyles Award in 2019. On December 19, 2022, he was named the head coach for the Midshipmen.

Personal life 
Newberry is married to his wife, Kate, and are the parents of a son, Max, and a daughter, Lyla.

Head coaching record

References

External links 
 Navy profile

Navy Midshipmen football coaches
Rice Owls football coaches
Baylor Bears football players
Elon Phoenix football coaches
Southern Arkansas Muleriders football coaches
Washington and Lee Generals football coaches
Lehigh Mountain Hawks football coaches
Northern Michigan Wildcats football coaches
Kennesaw State Owls football coaches
Sewanee Tigers football coaches
Living people

Year of birth missing (living people)